John Slonczewski was an American physicist known for his work on spin dynamics in magnetic systems.

Biography
Slonczewski did his undergraduate education at the Worcester Polytechnic Institute in 1950 and started his PhD on "Band structure of Graphite" at Rutgers University in 1958. He then joined the IBM Research center in Yorktown, New York as a staff researcher, where he stayed till his retirement in 2002. Slonczewski is known for his extensive theoretical study of magnetic system, in particular his applications of magnetic tunnel junctions (MTJ)s.

In 1979, Slonczewski co-authored a book entitled "Magnetic Domain Walls in Bubble Materials: Advances in Materials and Device Research".

In 2012, Slonczewski received the IEEE Magnetics Society achievement award. Along with Luc Berger, he was awarded the 2013 Oliver E. Buckley Condensed Matter Prize by the American Physical Society "for predicting spin-transfer torque and opening the field of current-induced control over magnetic nanostructures."

References

Further reading

1929 births
2019 deaths
21st-century American physicists
Worcester Polytechnic Institute alumni
Rutgers University alumni
IBM Fellows
Fellows of the American Physical Society
People from New York City
Oliver E. Buckley Condensed Matter Prize winners